Jay P. Greene is a Senior Research Fellow at the Heritage Foundation.  He was previously Distinguished Professor and head of the Department of Education Reform at the University of Arkansas. Greene’s current areas of research interest include school choice and the effects of education on character formation and civic values.  He is also known for his work studying culturally enriching field trips to art museums and theaters, his efforts to improve the accurate reporting of high school graduation rates, address financial incentives in special education, and the use of standardized tests to curb social promotion.

His research was cited four times in the U.S. Supreme Court's opinions in the landmark Zelman v. Simmons-Harris case on school vouchers. His research has appeared in academic journals, such as Education Finance and Policy, Economics of Education Review, and Educational Evaluation and Policy Analysis, as well as in major newspapers, such as the Wall Street Journal, New York Times, and the Washington Post. Greene is the author of Education Myths (Rowman & Littlefield, 2005),  Why America Needs School Choice (Encounter Broadside, 2011) and co-editor of Failure Up Close: What Happens, Why It Happens, and What We Can Learn from It (Rowman & Littlefield, 2018) and Religious Liberty and Education: A Case Study of Yeshivas vs. New York (Rowman & Littlefield, 2020).

Education
Tufts University Medford, Massachusetts
B.A. in History, Summa Cum Laude in May, 1988, Phi Beta Kappa 1987
Harvard University, Cambridge, Massachusetts
A.M. in Political Science in November 1991
Ph.D. in Political Science in June 1995

Research

Examples of his recent articles include:
Greene, J. P., Cheng, A., & Kingsbury I. (2021). Are Educated People More Anti-Semitic? Tablet Magazine, March 29.
Greene, J.P., Erickson, H.H., Watson, A.R., & Beck, M.I. (2018). The Play’s the Thing: Experimentally Examining the Social and Cognitive Effects of School Field Trips to Live Theater Performances. Educational Researcher, 47(4), 246-254. 
Greene, J.P., & Kingsbury, I. (2017). The Relationship Between Public and Private Schooling and AntiSemitism. Journal of School Choice, 11(1), 111-130. 
Greene,J. P, Hitt, C., Kraybill, A., & Bogulski, C. A. (2015). Learning from live theater. Education Next, 15(1), 54-61.
Kisida, B., Greene, J. P., & Bowen, D. H. (2014). Creating cultural consumers: The dynamics of cultural capital acquisition, Sociology of Education, 87(4), 281-295.
Greene, J. P., Kisida, B., & Bowen, D. H. (2014). The educational value of field trips. Education Next, 14(1), 78-86.
Bowen, D. H., Greene, J. P., & Kisida, B. (2014). Learning to think critically: A visual art experiment. Educational Researcher, 43(1), 37-44.
Margulis, E. H., Kisida, B., & Greene, J. P. (2013). A knowing ear: The effect of explicit information on children’s experience of a musical performance. Psychology of Music, Advance online publication. 1-10.
Bowen, D. H., & Greene, J. P. (2012). Does athletic success come at the expense of academic success?. Journal of Research in Education, 22(2), 1-22.
Winters, M. A., & Greene, J. P. (2012). The medium-run effects of Florida’s test-based promotion policy. Education Finance and Policy, 7(3), 305-330.
Winters, M. A., Dixon, B. L., & Greene, J. P. (2012). Observed characteristics and teacher quality: Impacts of sample selection on a value added model. Economics of Education Review, 31(1), 19-32.
Winters, M. A., & Greene, J. P. (2011). Public school response to special education vouchers: The impact of Florida’s McKay Scholarship Program on disability diagnosis and student achievement in public schools. Educational Evaluation and Policy Analysis, 33(2), 138-158.
Greene, J. P. (2011). The Big Rock Candy Mountain of education. In G. Forster & C. B. Thompson (Eds.), Freedom and School Choice in American Education (pp. 1-16). New York, NY: Palgrave Macmillan.
Greene, J. P., & Winters, M. A. (2011). Florida’s program to end social promotion. In D. L. Leal & C. B. Thompson (Eds.), The politics of Latino education (pp. 58-71). New York, NY: Teachers College Press.
Winters, M. A., Trivitt, J. R., & Greene, J. P. (2010). The impact of high-stakes testing on student proficiency in low-stakes subjects: Evidence from Florida’s elementary science exam. Economics of Education Review, 29(1), 138-146.

Blog

Jay P. Greene runs an award-winning group blog, Jay P. Greene’s Blog, that covers education policy.

References

External links
 Jay P. Greene’s Blog
 Biography and CV - University of Arkansas
 University of Arkansas Department of Education Reform

University of Arkansas faculty
Living people
Harvard Graduate School of Arts and Sciences alumni
Tufts University School of Arts and Sciences alumni
Year of birth missing (living people)